Dikto Yekar is an Indian politician from the state of Arunachal Pradesh.

Yekar was elected from the Daporijo constituency in the 2014 Arunachal Pradesh Legislative Assembly election, standing as an Indian National Congress candidate.

See also
Arunachal Pradesh Legislative Assembly

References

External links
 Dikto Yekar profile
 MyNeta Profile

Living people
Arunachal Pradesh MLAs 2014–2019
Bharatiya Janata Party politicians from Arunachal Pradesh
Year of birth missing (living people)
Janata Dal (United) politicians